SS Berlin  may refer to one of the following ships

, a German passenger liner built by Caird & Company and operated by Norddeutscher Lloyd for service between Bremen and Baltimore
, a British cargo ship operated by the Yorkshire Coal and Shipping company
, a British passenger liner operated by the Great Eastern Railway company
, a Danish cargo ship
, a German passenger liner which saw service as an auxiliary cruiser during World War I
, a German passenger liner and World War II hospital ship

See also
, a German passenger liner, built as the Swedish Gripsholm

Ship names